This is a list of notable events in music that took place in the year 1951.

Specific locations
1951 in British music
1951 in Norwegian music

Specific genres
1951 in country music
1951 in jazz

Events
January 29 – Nilla Pizzi wins the first annual Sanremo Music Festival with "Grazie dei fiori".
February 22 – The first complete performance of Charles Ives's Symphony No. 2, written between 1897 and 1902, is given in Carnegie Hall by the New York Philharmonic orchestra, conducted by Leonard Bernstein.
March 3-5 – Jackie Brenston "and His Delta Cats" (actually Ike Turner's Kings of Rhythm) record "Rocket 88" at Sam Phillips' Sun Studio in Memphis, Tennessee, a candidate for the first rock and roll record (released in April).
March 5 – The Suk Trio, consisting of Josef Suk (violinist), Jiří Hubička (pianist) and Saša Večtomov (cellist), make their debut, at the Rudolfinum Hall in Prague (Czechoslovakia).
April 4 – Frankie Laine, newly signed by Columbia Records, becoming the highest paid vocalist of his day, immediately justifies his new contract by recording the double-sided megahit "Jezebel"/"Rose, Rose, I Love You", the latter being the only major popular music chart hit in the United States written by a Chinese composer (Chen Gexin).
April 18 – An article entitled "The Fight Against Formalism in Art and Literature, for a Progressive German Culture" appears in the Tägliche Rundschau, official daily of the Soviet Government in Germany, promulgating the new cultural policy of the DDR.
May 9–26 – The Queen Elisabeth Competition for violin is held (for the first time under that name) in Brussels, Belgium. Leonid Kogan is awarded first prize.
June 9 – Joseph Haydn's opera L'anima del filosofo, better known by its alternative title Orfeo ed Euridice and written in 1791–92, is given its world premiere at the Maggio Musicale Fiorentino.
June 14 – Bill Haley and His Saddlemen record their version of "Rocket 88", combining the rhythm and blues arrangement of the version recorded in early March by Jackie Brentson with country music trappings.
June 22 – July 10 – Darmstädter Internationale Ferienkurse held in Darmstadt.
July 2–14 – The seventh annual Cheltenham Music Festival is held in Cheltenham, England, with a performance of Brian Easdale's opera The Sleeping Children, premieres of the first symphonies of Malcolm Arnold, John Gardner and Arnold van Wyk, Franz Reizenstein's Serenade for Winds and Maurice Jacobson's Symphonic Suite, as well as performances of works by Humphrey Searle, Robert Masters, Benjamin Frankel and Philip Sainton.
July 11 – Disc jockey and music promoter Alan Freed broadcasts his first Rhythm and blues radio programme from station WJW in Cleveland, Ohio. Freed uses the term rock and roll to describe R&B, in an effort to introduce the music to a broader white audience.
July 14–21 – The Haslemere Music Festival, consisting of six concerts of early music, takes place in Haslemere, England.
July 29 – The annual Bayreuth Festival resumes for the first time since the Second World War, now under the general direction of Wieland Wagner, with an opening concert of Beethoven's Symphony No. 9 conducted by Wilhelm Furtwängler, followed by productions of Der Ring des Nibelungen, Parsifal and Die Meistersinger.
August – The annual Salzburg Festival takes place in Salzburg, Austria, featuring four opera productions from the Vienna State Opera: Mozart's Idomeneo and Die Zauberflöte and Verdi's Otello, all conducted by Wilhelm Furtwängler, and Berg's Wozzeck, conducted by Karl Böhm, as well as seven orchestral concerts by the Vienna Philharmonic (two conducted by Wilhelm Furtwängler and one each by Edwin Fischer, Rafael Kubelík, Eugen Jochum, Karl Böhm, and Leopold Stokowski), six choral concerts, four chamber-music concerts, three solo recitals, and a number of smaller events.
September 5 – Opening of the month-long Berlin Festival of the Arts, with a performance in the New Schillertheater of Beethoven's Symphony No. 9 by the Berlin Philharmonic conducted by Wilhelm Furtwängler. Subsequent musical events include performances of Gian Carlo Menotti's The Consul, Benjamin Britten's Let's Make an Opera and the first German performance of Oklahoma!.
September 11 – The Rake's Progress, an opera by Igor Stravinsky with libretto by W. H. Auden and Chester Kallman, premieres in Venice, conducted by the composer.
September 17–22 – The fourth annual Swansea Festival of Music and the Arts opens in Swansea, Wales, with a controversial speech by one of Wales's leading composers, Daniel Jones. The festival is the final component in the Festival of Britain and consists of seven programmes, featuring Welsh composer Arwel Hughes's new oratorio St. David and appearances by Victoria de los Ángeles, Zino Francescatti, André Navarra, Walter Susskind and Jean Martinon.
October 6–7 – The Donaueschinger Musiktage features the world premieres of Ernst Krenek's Double Concerto for viola, piano, and small orchestra, Rolf Liebermann's Piano Sonata, Pierre Boulez's Polyphonie X for 18 solo instruments, Hermann Reutter's Der himmlische Vagant, lyrische Portrait des F. Villon von Klabund for alto and baritone voices and instrumental ensemble, and Marcel Mihalovici's Étude en deux parties for piano and ensemble, as well as German first performances of works by Messiaen, Guido Turchi, Harsányi, Jelinek, and Honegger, and a performance of Henze's Third Symphony.
October 21 – Opening of a "Festival of Music and the Arts" at Wexford in Ireland, the forerunner of Wexford Festival Opera.
October 22 – Reopening of the Royal Opera House, London, with a production of Puccini's Turandot, conducted by Sir John Barbirolli and with Gertrude Grob-Prandl in the title role.
November 29 – December 3 – The Hamburg Radio Symphony Orchestra, conducted by Hans Schmidt-Isserstedt, plays four concerts in London as part of a thirteen-concert tour of England and Ireland.
November – Dinah Shore begins her first TV series, The Dinah Shore Show, which will run for 5½ years.
December 7 – Opening of the opera season at La Scala in Milan, three weeks earlier than the traditional date of December 26, with a double-bill consisting of Verdi's I vespri siciliani and Stravinsky's The Rake's Progress.
Teresa Brewer leaves the London label for Coral Records.
Georgia Gibbs leaves Coral to sign with Mercury Records, where she will have all of her biggest hits.

Albums released
Ballin' the Jack – Georgia Gibbs
Beloved Hymns – Bing Crosby
Bing and the Dixieland Bands – Bing Crosby
Bing Sing Victor Herbert – Bing Crosby
Blue Period – Miles Davis
Country Style – Bing Crosby
Dig – Miles Davis
Down Memory Lane – Bing Crosby
Folk Song Favorites – Patti Page
Go West, Young Man – Bing Crosby
Historically Speaking – Gerry Mulligan
Hoop-De-Doo – Ames Brothers
I'll See You in My Dreams – Doris Day
In the Evening by the Moonlight – Ames Brothers
Let's Polka – Frank Yankovic Orchestra (Pontiac Records PLP-520)
Lullaby of Broadway – Doris Day
Music, Maestro Please – Frankie Laine
On Moonlight Bay – Doris Day
One for My Baby – Frankie Laine
Porgy and Bess – Various Artists
Precious Memories – Bill Kenny
Sentimental Me – Ames Brothers
Sweet Leilani – Ames Brothers
Teresa Brewer – Teresa Brewer
Two Tickets to Broadway – Dinah Shore
Way Back Home – Bing Crosby
Wonderful Words – The Mills Brothers

US No 1 hit singles
These singles reached the top of US Billboard magazine's charts in 1951.

Biggest hit singles
The following songs achieved the highest chart positions
in the limited set of charts available for 1951.

Top hits on record

Top R&B hits on record
"Rocket 88" – Jackie Brenston and his Delta Cats
"Sixty-Minute Man" – Dominoes
"The Glory Of Love" – Five Keys
"The Thrill Is Gone" – Roy Hawkins

Published popular music
 "Alice In Wonderland" – w. Bob Hilliard m. Sammy Fain
 "All In The Golden Afternoon" – w. Bob Hilliard m. Sammy Fain
 "Allentown Jail" – w.m. Irving Gordon
 "And So To Sleep Again" w.m. Joe Marsala & Sunny Skylar
 "Anywhere I Wander" – w.m. Frank Loesser
 "A-Round The Corner" – trad arr. Josef Marais
 "Asia Minor" – w.m. Roger King Mozian
 "A-Sleepin' At The Foot Of The Bed" – Happy Wilson, Luther Patrick
 "Be My Life's Companion" – w.m. Bob Hilliard & Milton De Lugg
 "Beautiful Brown Eyes" – trad arr. Arthur Smith & Alton Delmore
 "Because of You" – w.m. Arthur Hammerstein & Dudley Wilkinson
 "Belle, Belle, My Liberty Belle" – w.m. Bob Merrill
 "Bermuda" – w.m. Cynthia Strother & Eugene R. Strother
 "The Blacksmith Blues" – w.m. Jack Holmes
 "Blue Velvet" – w.m. Bernie Wayne & Lee Morris
 "Christopher Columbus" – w.m. Terry Gilkyson
 "Come On-A My House" – w.m. Ross Bagdasarian & William Saroyan
 "Cry" – w.m. Churchill Kohlman
 "Dance Me Loose" – w. Mel Howard m. Lee Erwin
 "Domino" – w. (Eng) Don Raye (Fr) Jacques Plante m. Louis Ferrari
 "Getting To Know You" – w. Oscar Hammerstein II m. Richard Rodgers
 "Good Morning Mister Echo" – w.m. Bill Putman & Belinda Putman
 "Half As Much" – w.m. Curly Williams
 "He Had Refinement" – w. Dorothy Fields m. Arthur Schwartz
 "Hello, Young Lovers" – w. Oscar Hammerstein II m. Richard Rodgers
 "Hey, Good Lookin"' – w.m. Hank Williams
 "How Could You Believe Me When I Said I Love You When You Know I've Been A Liar All My Life?" – w. Alan Jay Lerner m. Burton Lane
 "I Can't Help It (If I'm Still In Love With You)" – w.m. Hank Williams
 "I Get Ideas" – w. Dorcas Cochran m. Lenny Sanders
 "I Have Dreamed" – w. Oscar Hammerstein II m. Richard Rodgers
 "I Love Lucy theme song" m. Eliot Daniel
 "I Love The Sunshine Of Your Smile" – w. Jack Hoffman m. Jimmy MacDonald
 "I Still See Elisa" – w. Alan Jay Lerner m. Frederick Loewe. Introduced by James Barton in the musical Paint Your Wagon. Performed in the film version by Clint Eastwood.
 "I Talk To The Trees" – w. Alan Jay Lerner m. Frederick Loewe. Introduced by Tony Bavaar and Olga San Juan in the musical Paint Your Wagon
 "I Whistle A Happy Tune" – w. Oscar Hammerstein II m. Richard Rodgers
 "I Wish I Wuz" – w.m. Sid Kuller & Lyn Murray. Introduced in the film Slaughter Trail
 "I Won't Cry Anymore" – w. Fred Wise m. Al Frisch
 "I'm A Fool To Want You" – w.m. Jack Wolf, Joel Herron & Frank Sinatra
 "I'm Late" – w. Bob Hilliard m. Sammy Fain
 "In The Cool, Cool, Cool Of The Evening" – w. Johnny Mercer m. Hoagy Carmichael. Introduced by Bing Crosby and Jane Wyman in the film Here Comes the Groom.
 "It's All In The Game" – w. Carl Sigman m. Charles Gates Dawes Based on "Melody" by Dawes 1912.
 "It's Beginning to Look a Lot Like Christmas" – w.m. Meredith Willson
 "Jezebel" – w.m. Wayne Shanklin
 "A Kiss To Build A Dream On" – w. Oscar Hammerstein II m. Harry Ruby
 "Kisses Sweeter Than Wine" – w. Paul Campbell m. Joel Newman
 "The Little White Cloud That Cried" – w.m. Johnnie Ray
 "The March Of The Siamese Children" – m. Richard Rodgers
 "Mister and Mississippi" – w.m. Irving Gordon
 "Misto Cristofo Columbo" – w.m. Jay Livingston & Ray Evans
 "Mockin' Bird Hill" – w.m. Vaughn Horton
 "The Morningside Of The Mountain" – w.m. Dick Manning & Larry Stock
 "My Truly, Truly Fair" – w.m. Bob Merrill
 "No Two People" – w.m. Frank Loesser
 "Sail Away" – w.m. Noël Coward
 "Shall We Dance?" – w. Oscar Hammerstein II m. Richard Rodgers
 "Somewhere Along The Way" – w. Sammy Gallop m. Kurt Adams
 "Shanghai" – w.m. Bob Hilliard & Milton De Lugg
 "Shrimp Boats" – w.m. Paul Mason Howard & Paul Weston
 "(It's No) Sin" – w. Chester R. Shull m. George Hoven
 "Slow Poke" – w.m. Pee Wee King, Redd Stewart & Chilton Price
 "So Far, So Good" – w. Betty Comden & Adolph Green m. Jule Styne from the revue Two On The Aisle
 "Something Wonderful" – w. Oscar Hammerstein II m. Richard Rodgers
 "Sound Off" – w.m. Willie Lee Duckworth, B. Lentz
 "Sparrow In The Tree Top" – w.m. Bob Merrill
 "Suzy Snowflake" – w.m. Sid Tepper & Roy C. Bennett
 "Sweet Violets" – arr. Cy Coben & Charles Grean
 "Tell Me Why" – w. Al Alberts m. Marty Gold
 "They Call The Wind Maria" – w. Alan Jay Lerner m. Frederick Loewe. Introduced in the musical Paint Your Wagon by Rufus Smith
 "The Thrill Is Gone" – w.m. Rick Darnell & Roy Hawkins
 "Thumbelina" – w.m. Frank Loesser
 "Too Young" – w. Sylvia Dee m. Sidney Lippman
 "Top Banana" – w.m. Johnny Mercer from the musical Top Banana (musical)
 "The Typewriter" – m. Leroy Anderson
 "Unforgettable" – w.m. Irving Gordon
 "Vanity" – w. Jack Manus & Bernard Bierman m. Guy Wood
 "Very Good Advice" – w. Bob Hilliard m. Sammy Fain
 "A Very Merry Un-Birthday To You" – w.m. Mack David, Al Hoffman & Jerry Livingston
 "Wand'rin' Star" – w. Alan Jay Lerner m. Frederick Loewe. Introduced by Rufus Smith, Robert Penn and Jared Reed in the musical Paint Your Wagon.
 "We Kiss In A Shadow" – w. Oscar Hammerstein II m. Richard Rodgers
 "When The World Was Young" – w. (Eng) Johnny Mercer (Fr) Angela Vannier m. M. Philippe-Gerard
 "Wonderful Copenhagen" – w.m. Frank Loesser
 "Would I Love You (Love You, Love You)" – w. Bob Russell m. Harold Spina

Classical music

Premieres

Compositions
Jean Absil
Contes for trumpet and piano, Op. 76
Les météores, ballet for orchestra Op. 77
Murray Adaskin – Ballet Symphony for orchestra
 Yasushi Akutagawa
Ballata for violin and piano
Kappa ballet for orchestra
Shitsuraku-en (Paradise Lost) ballet for orchestra
Hugo Alfvén – Sängen till Folkare for baritone and piano or male choir and piano or male choir unaccompanied
Hendrik Andriessen
Aubade for brass quartet
Choral No. 4 for organ (revised version)
Liederen (3), for choir
Sonata for unaccompanied cello
Suite for brass quartet
Wind Quintet
Jurriaan Andriessen – Flute Concerto
István Anhalt
Arc en ciel ballet for two pianos
Funeral Music for ten instruments
Piano Sonata
Psalm 19: A Benediction for baritone and piano
Songs of Love (3) for SSA choir
George Antheil
Accordion Dance for orchestra
Fragments from Shelley (8) for choir and piano
Nocturne in Skyrockets for orchestra
Sonata for flute and piano
Sonata for trumpet and piano
Denis ApIvor
The Goodman of Paris ballet for orchestra, Op. 18
A Mirror for Witches ballet for orchestra, Op.19
Suite Concertante for piano and small orchestra, Op.18a
Boris Arapov – Russian Suite for orchestra
Violet Archer – Fantasy in the Form of a Passacaglia for brass
José Ardévol – Symphonic Variations for cello and orchestra
Malcolm Arnold
Oboe Sonatina, Op. 28
Clarinet Sonatina, Op. 29
Machines, symphonic study, Op. 30
A Sussex Overture, Op. 31
Concerto for Piano Four-Hands and String Orchestra, Op. 32
English Dances, set 2, Op. 33
Alexander Arutiunian – Concertino for piano and orchestra
Georges Auric – Chemin de lumière ballet (also orchestral suite)
Milton Babbitt
Du for soprano and piano
The Widow's Lament in Springtime, for soprano and piano
 Jesús Bal y Gay – Concerto Grosso
 Luciano Berio
Deus meus for voice and three instruments
Due liriche di Garcia Lorca for bass and orchestra
Due pezzi for violin and piano
Opus no. Zoo for reciter and wind quintet
Sonatina for wind quartet [withdrawn]
 Pierre Boulez – Polyphonie X
Martin Boykan – Duo for violin and piano
Benjamin Britten – Six Metamorphoses after Ovid for oboe and piano
Earle Brown – Three Pieces for piano
John Cage
Imaginary Landscape No. 4
Music of Changes
Elliott Carter – String Quartet No. 1
Carlos Chávez – "Happy Birthday", for a cappella chorus
Henry Cowell
Clown dance music for piano
Duet for Sidney with Love from Henry for violin and cello
Her Smile Is as Sweet as a Rose for unaccompanied voice
Scherzo for soprano and alto recorders
Signature of Light for voice and piano
Tenth Anniversary for piano
George Crumb
Pieces (3) for piano
Prelude and Toccata for piano
Dimitrie Cuclin – Sinfonia No. 13
Luigi Dallapiccola – Tartiniana
David Diamond
The Midnight Meditation song cycle for voice and piano
Mizmor L'David, sacred service for tenor, choir, and organ
Piano Trio
String Quartet No. 4
Henri Dutilleux – Symphony No. 1
George Enescu – String Quartet No. 2, Op. 22, No. 2
Morton Feldman
Extensions I, for violin and piano
Intersection, for tape
Intersection I for orchestra
Marginal Intersection for orchestra
Projection II, for 5 instruments
Projection III, for two pianos
Projection IV, for violin and piano
Projection V, for 9 instruments
Songs (4), for soprano, cello, and piano
Structures for string quartet
Howard Ferguson – Piano Concerto in D
Gerald Finzi
"God Is Gone Up", from 3 Anthems Op. 27
All This Night, Op. 33
Muses and Graces, Op. 34
Let Us Now Praise Famous Men, Op. 35
Lukas Foss – Piano Concerto No. 2
Roberto Gerhard
Sardana No. 3 for winds and percussion
Piano Concerto
Reinhold Glière – Horn Concerto
Karel Goeyvaerts
Sonata for Two Pianos
Nummer 2 for thirteen instruments
Bengt Hambraeus
Cantata pro defunctis for baritone and organ
Concerto for Organ and Harpsichord (revised version)
Liturgia pro organo
Howard Hanson – Fantasy-Variations on a Theme of Youth for piano and strings
Roy Harris
Cumberland Concerto for orchestra
Fantasy for piano and "pops" orchestra
Red Cross Hymn for choir and band
Paul Hindemith – Die Harmonie der Welt Symphony
Vagn Holmboe – Sinfonia boreale (Symphony No. 8)
Alan Hovhaness
Concerto No. 1 ("Arevakal") for orchestra, Op. 88
Concerto No. 2 for violin and strings, Op. 89, No. 1
Fantasy on an Ossetin Tune for piano, Op. 85
Four Motets, for SATB choir, Op. 87
From the End of the Earth for SATB choir and organ (or piano), Op. 187
Gamelan and Jhala for carillon, Op. 106
Hanna for 2 clarinets and 2 pianos, Op. 101
Hymn to a Celestial Musician for piano, Op. 111, No. 2
Jhala for piano, Op. 103
Make Haste, motet for SATB choir, Op. 86
Khaldis concerto for 4 trumpets, piano, and percussion, Op. 91
Khirgiz Suite for violin and piano, Op. 73, No. 1
Lullaby (a.k.a. Slumber Song for piano, Op. 52, No. 2
Sing Aloud for SATB choir, Op. 68
Suite for violin, piano and percussion, Op. 99
Talin concerto for viola and strings, Op. 93, No. 1
Toccata and Fugue on a Kabardin Tune for piano, Op. 6, No. 2
Upon Enchanted Ground for flute, cello, harp, and tam-tam, Op. 90, No. 1
Akira Ifukube – Drumming of Japan
André Jolivet – Piano Concerto
Wojciech Kilar –
Sonatina for flute and piano
Three preludes for piano
Variations on a Theme by Paganini for piano
Gail Kubik – Symphony Concertante [1952 Pulitzer]
György Ligeti – Concert românesc
Douglas Lilburn – Symphony No. 2
Witold Lutosławski
Jesień
Polskich pieśni ludowych na tematy żołnierskie (10) for male choir
Recitative and Arioso for violin and piano
Silesian Triptych
Gian Francesco Malipiero – Sinfonia dello Zodiaco
Frank Martin – Violin Concerto
Bohuslav Martinů
Piano Trio No. 3
Serenade for Two Clarinets and String Trio
Stowe Pastorals
Peter Mennin – String Quartet No. 2
Darius Milhaud
Le candélabre à sept branches, Op. 315
Concertino d'automne for two pianos and eight instruments, Op. 309
Concertino d'été for viola and chamber orchestra, Op. 311
Les miracles de la foi, cantata for tenor, chorus and orchestra, Op. 314
José Pablo Moncayo – Muros verdes for piano
Xavier Montsalvatge
Cuarteto indiano
Poema Concertante for violin and orchestra
Luigi Nono
Composizione no. 1 for orchestra
Polifonica – monodia – ritmica, for flute, clarinet, bass clarinet, saxophone, horn, piano, and percussion
 Vincent Persichetti – Symphony No. 4
Allan Pettersson – Seven Sonatas for Two Violins
Walter Piston – String Quartet No. 4
Henri Pousseur
Missa brevis for four mixed voices
Sept Versets des Psaumes de la Pénitence for four solo voices or mixed choir
 Sergei Prokofiev – Symphony-Concerto for cello and orchestra
Peter Racine Fricker – Symphony No. 2
Joaquín Rodrigo – Sonatas de Castilla
Guy Ropartz – String Quartet No. 6
Ned Rorem
Cycle of Holy Songs (Psalms 134, 142, 148, 150) for vice and piano
From an Unknown Past song cycle for voice and piano
Love in a Life for voice and piano
The Nightingale for voice and piano
Seven Choruses for a cappella choir
To a Young Girl for voice and piano
Edmund Rubbra – String Quartet No. 2
Hermann Schroeder – Ave Maria zart chorale-prelude for organ
Mátyás Seiber – Concertino for clarinet and ensemble
Roger Sessions – String Quartet No. 2
Dmitri Shostakovich – Preludes and Fugues (24) for piano
Reginald Smith Brindle – Concertino for guitar and chamber orchestra
Karlheinz Stockhausen – Kreuzspiel
Virgil Thomson
Chromatic Double Harmonies: Portrait of Sylvia Marlowe in Nine Etudes for piano
De profundis (Psalm 30), SATB choir (revised version)
For a Happy Occasion (Happy Birthday for Mrs. Zimbalist) for piano
Eduard Tubin – Sonata for alto saxophone solo
David Van Vactor – Violin Concerto
Villa-Lobos, Heitor
Guitar Concerto
Quinteto (em forma de chôros), version for conventional wind quintet with horn instead of cor anglais
Rudá (Dio d'amore), symphonic poem and ballet
String Quartet No. 13
Symphony No. 9
Frank Wigglesworth – Summer Scenes for flute, oboe, and strings

Opera
Benjamin Britten – Billy Budd, with libretto by E. M. Forster and Eric Crozier (1 December, Covent Garden)
Paul Dessau – The Trial of Lucullus, with libretto by Bertolt Brecht (March 18, Berlin), despite rumours that the work would be forbidden by the East German authorities.
Jean Françaix – L'apostrophe, libretto based on Balzac (1 July, Amsterdam, Netherlands Opera)
Joseph Haydn – Orfeo et Euridice (9 June, Teatro della Pergola, Florence, at the fourteenth Maggio Musicale Fiorentino).
Marcel Landowski – Le Rire de Nils Halerius
Jan Meyerowitz – Eastward in Eden, libretto adapted by Dorothy Gardner from her own play (16 November, Detroit, Wayne State University Theatre).
Gian-Carlo Menotti – Amahl and the Night Visitors 24 December, NBC television broadcast, live from Radio City Studio H-8 (New York).
 Igor Stravinsky – The Rake's Progress, with libretto by W. H. Auden and Chester Kallman, Venice, Teatro La Fenice, 11 September.
 Peter Tranchell – The Mayor of Casterbridge, libretto adapted from the novel by Thomas Hardy (30 July, Cambridge, Arts Theatre).
 Ralph Vaughan Williams – The Pilgrim's Progress
 Egon Wellesz – Incognita, from a novel by William Congreve (December, Oxford).

Jazz

Musical theater
 And So To Bed (Vivian Ellis) London production opened at the New Theatre on October 17 and ran for 323 performances
 Flahooley (E. Y. Harburg and Sammy Fain) Broadway production opened at the Broadhurst Theatre on May 14 and ran for 40 performances.
 Gay's The Word London production opened at the Saville Theatre on February 16 and ran for 504 performances
 The King and I (Richard Rodgers and Oscar Hammerstein II) – Broadway production opened at the St. James Theatre on March 29 and ran for 1,246 performances
 Kiss Me, Kate (Cole Porter) – London production opened at the Coliseum on March 8 and ran for 501 performances
 Make a Wish (Hugh Martin)Broadway production opened at the Winter Garden Theatre on April 18 and ran for 102 performances. Starred Nanette Fabray.
 Oklahoma! first German production (Berlin)
 Paint Your Wagon (Alan Jay Lerner and Frederick Loewe) – Broadway production opened at the Shubert Theatre on November 12 and ran for 289 performances
 Penny Plain – London production
 See You Later (Sandy Wilson) London production opened at the Watergate Theatre on October 3.
 Seventeen Broadway production opened at the Broadhurst Theatre on June 21 and ran for 182 performances
 South Pacific (Rodgers & Hammerstein) – London production
 Top Banana Broadway production opened at the Winter Garden Theatre on November 1 and ran for 350 performances.
 A Tree Grows in Brooklyn Broadway production opened at the Alvin Theatre on April 19 and ran for 267 performances
 Two On The Aisle – Broadway production opened at the Mark Hellinger Theatre on July 19 and ran for 279 performances
 Zip Goes A Million (Book: Eric Maschwitz Words: Eric Maschwitz Music: George Posford – London production opened at the Palace Theatre on October 20 and ran for 544 performances. Starring George Formby, Sara Gregory & Warde Donovan. Directed by Charles Hickman

Musical films
 Alice In Wonderland (original Disney animated film)
 An American In Paris starring Gene Kelly, Leslie Caron, Oscar Levant, Georges Guétary and Nina Foch
 Call Me Mister starring Betty Grable and Dan Dailey
 Excuse My Dust starring Red Skelton, Monica Lewis, Sally Forrest, Macdonald Carey and William Demarest. Dirested by Roy Rowland.
 The Great Caruso (starring Mario Lanza)
 Here Comes the Groom released September 20 starring Bing Crosby and Jane Wyman.
 The Lemon Drop Kid starring Bob Hope and Marilyn Maxwell.
 Lullaby Of Broadway starring Doris Day and Gene Nelson
 Mr. Imperium starring Lana Turner and Ezio Pinza
 On Moonlight Bay starring Doris Day and Gordon MacRae
 On the Riviera starring Danny Kaye, Gene Tierney and Corinne Calvet
 Purple Heart Diary starring Frances Langford, Judd Holdren, Ben Lessy and Tony Romano. Directed by Richard Quine.
 Rich, Young and Pretty starring Jane Powell, Danielle Darrieux, Wendell Corey, Vic Damone and Una Merkel
 Royal Wedding starring Fred Astaire and Jane Powell
 Show Boat (directed by George Sidney based on the stage musical)
 The Strip starring Mickey Rooney and featuring Louis Armstrong
 Two Tickets to Broadway released November 20 starring Janet Leigh, Tony Martin, Gloria DeHaven, Ann Miller and Bob Crosby.

Births
January 6 – Kim Wilson, blues singer (The Fabulous Thunderbirds)
January 9 – Crystal Gayle, country singer
January 19
Dewey Bunnell (America)
Martha Davis (The Motels)
January 20 – Ian Hill Judas Priest
January 26
David Briggs, Australian guitarist, songwriter and producer
Roy Goodman, English violinist and conductor
Andy Hummel, American singer-songwriter and bass player (d. 2010)
Christopher North, American keyboard player
January 27
Brian Downey, drummer (Thin Lizzy)
Seth Justman (The J. Geils Band)
January 30 – Phil Collins, drummer, singer and actor (Genesis)
January 31
K.C. (Harry Wayne Casey), singer (K.C. and the Sunshine Band)
Phil Manzanera, guitarist (Roxy Music)
February 4 – Phil Ehart, American drummer (Kansas)
February 7 – Andy Chapin, English keyboard player (The Association) (d. 1985)
February 9 – Dennis Thomas (Kool and the Gang)
February 12 – Gil Moore (Triumph)
February 14 – Sylvain Sylvain, glam rock/protopunk guitarist (New York Dolls) (d. 2021)
February 15 – Melissa Manchester, singer
February 22 – Ellen Greene, singer and actress
February 27 – Steve Harley, singer (Cockney Rebel)
March 4 – Chris Rea, singer-songwriter
March 5 – Willis Alan Ramsey, American singer-songwriter and guitarist
March 9 – Zakir Hussain, Indian tabla player, music producer, film actor and soundtrack composer
March 17 – Scott Gorham (Thin Lizzy)
March 20 – Jimmie Vaughan (The Fabulous Thunderbirds)
March 21
Russell Thompkins, Jr., vocalist (The Stylistics)
Conrad Lozano (Los Lobos)
 Nigel Dick, British music video director, film director, writer and musician
March 23 – Phil Keaggy, guitarist, singer
April 3 – Mel Schacher (Question Mark & the Mysterians, Grand Funk Railroad)
April 6 – Pascal Rogé, pianist
April 7 – Janis Ian, singer-songwriter
April 8 – Joan Sebastian, born José Figueroa, singer-songwriter (d. 2015)
April 12 – Alex Briley (Village People)
April 13
Peabo Bryson, singer
Max Weinberg, drummer and bandleader (Late Night with Conan O'Brien)
April 14 – Julian Lloyd Webber, cellist
April 20 – Luther Vandross, soul singer (d. 2005)
April 22 – Paul Carrack, singer, songwriter and multi-instrumentalist
April 27 – Ace Frehley (Kiss)
May 3 – Christopher Cross, singer-songwriter (Michael McDonald Band, Alan Parsons Project)
May 4
Jackie Jackson, vocalist (The Jackson Five)
Mick Mars (Mötley Crüe)
May 8 – Philip Bailey, vocalist (Earth, Wind & Fire)
May 10
Ronald Banks (The Dramatics)
John Magnar Bernes, Norwegian singer and harmonica player
May 16 – Jonathan Richman
May 19 – Joey Ramone, singer (Ramones) (d. 2001)
June 3 – Deniece Williams, singer
June 6 – Dwight Twilley, American singer-songwriter and producer
June 8 – Bonnie Tyler, singer
June 10 – Ed McTaggart (Daniel Amos, The Road Home)
June 12
Bun E. Carlos (Cheap Trick)
Brad Delp (Boston) (d. 2007)
June 15 – Steve Walsh, progressive rock singer-songwriter (Kansas)
June 19
Patty Larkin, American singer-songwriter, guitarist and producer
Karen Young, Canadian singer-songwriter
June 26 – Tony Currenti, drummer (AC/DC)
June 30 – Steve Waller, guitarist (d. 2000)
July 1 – Fred Schneider (The B-52s)
July 7 – Blondie Chaplin, guitarist and singer
July 11 – Bonnie Pointer (The Pointer Sisters)
July 12 – Sylvia Sass, operatic soprano
July 15 – Gregory Isaacs, reggae musician (d. 2010)
July 22 – Richard Bennett, American guitarist and producer (The Notorious Cherry Bombs)
August 2 – Andrew Gold, singer-songwriter (d. 2011)
August 3 – Johnny Graham (Earth, Wind & Fire)
August 4 – Lois V Vierk, composer
August 13 – Dan Fogelberg, singer-songwriter, composer and multi-instrumentalist (d. 2007)
August 15 – Bobby Caldwell, singer-songwriter and multi-instrumentalist (d. 2023)
August 19 – John Deacon, bass guitarist (Queen)
August 23
Jimi Jamison (Survivor)
Mark Hudson (The Hudson Brothers)
August 25 – Rob Halford (Judas Priest)
August 28 – Wayne Osmond, vocalist, multi-instrumentalist and songwriter (The Osmonds)
September 2 – Mik Kaminski (Electric Light Orchestra)
September 6 – Šaban Šaulić, Serbian folk singer (d. 2019)
September 7 – Chrissie Hynde, singer (The Pretenders)
September 12 – Olga Breeskin, violinist, dancer and actress
September 19 – Daniel Lanois, record producer, guitarist and singer-songwriter
September 22 – David Coverdale, vocalist (Deep Purple, Whitesnake)
September 25 – Peter Dvorský, operatic tenor
October 2 – Sting, singer
October 5 – Bob Geldof, singer (The Boomtown Rats), social campaigner & organizer of LiveAid
October 6 – Kevin Cronin (REO Speedwagon)
October 7 – John Mellencamp, singer-songwriter, artist and actor
October 13 – John Ford Coley, singer, pianist, guitarist, actor and author
October 19 – Lilia Vera, Venezuelan folk singer
October 20 – Al Greenwood, rock keyboardist (Foreigner)
October 23 – Charly García, singer-songwriter and pianist
October 26 – Maggie Roche (The Roches) (d. 2017)
October 27 – K. K. Downing (Judas Priest)
November 1 – Ronald Bell (Kool & the Gang) (d. 2020)
November 13 – Bill Gibson (Huey Lewis and the News)
November 14 – Alec John Such, American bass player (Bon Jovi)
November 15 – Joe Puerta, American singer and bass player (Ambrosia)
November 18 – Heinrich Schiff, Austrian cellist and conductor (d. 2016)
November 27 – Kevin Kavanaugh (Southside Johnny and The Asbury Jukes)
November 29 – Barry Goudreau, rock guitarist (Boston)
December 4 – Gary Rossington, rock guitarist (Lynyrd Skynyrd, Rossington-Collins Band) (d. 2023)
December 10 – Johnny Rodriguez, country singer
December 16
Robben Ford, guitarist
Mark Heard, singer-songwriter (d. 1992)
December 21 – Nick Gilder, singer and songwriter
December 25 – Barbara Dever, operatic soprano
December 26
Paul Quinn, heavy metal guitarist (Saxon)
John Scofield, jazz guitarist and composer
December 29 – Yvonne Elliman, singer
December 31
Tom Hamilton (Aerosmith)
George Thorogood, blues musician
date unknown – Lorenzo Ferrero, composer

Deaths
January 20 – Alexander Chuhaldin, violinist, conductor, composer, and music educator, 58
February 3 – Fréhel, French singer, actress, 59
February 9 – Eddy Duchin, pianist and bandleader, 41 (leukaemia)
February 20 – Howard Brockway, composer, 80
February 28 – Giannina Russ, operatic soprano, 77
March 5 – Leo Singer, vaudeville impresario, 73
March 6 – Ivor Novello, operetta composer, entertainer, 58 (coronary thrombosis)
March 12 – Harold Bauer, pianist and violinist, 77
March 25 – Sid Catlett, jazz drummer, 41 (heart attack)
April 21 – Olive Fremstad, operatic soprano, 80
May 29
Fanny Brice, US actress, comedian and singer
Josef Bohuslav Foerster, Czech classical composer (born 1859)
Robert Kahn, composer, 85
June 4 – Serge Koussevitzky, double-bassist, conductor and composer, 76
June 26 – Frank Ferera, Hawaiian musician (born 1885)
July 9
Giannina Arangi-Lombardi, operatic soprano, 60
Egbert Van Alstyne, US songwriter
Jorgen Bentzon, Danish composer
July 13 – Arnold Schoenberg, Austrian composer, 76
August 15 – Artur Schnabel, pianist, 69
August 21 – Constant Lambert, composer, 45 (pneumonia and undiagnosed diabetes)
September 2 – Pietro Frosini, accordionist, 67
September 3 – Leo Sheffield, d'Oyly Carte star, 77
September 14 – Fritz Busch, conductor, 61
September 17 – Jimmy Yancey, US jazz pianist
November 4 – Oscar Natzka, opera singer, 39
November 9 – Sigmund Romberg, composer
November 11 – César Vezzani, operatic tenor, 63
November 13 – Nikolai Medtner, pianist and composer, 71
December 1 – Edward Joseph Collins, pianist, conductor and composer
December 26 – Vic Berton, jazz drummer, 55
date unknown
Giuseppina Huguet, operatic soprano (born 1871)
Margot Ruddock, actress and singer (born 1907)
Vince Courtney songwriter and performer

Notes

 
20th century in music
Music by year